Turneja: Bilo jednom u Hrvatskoj Maksimir is a concert video of the Croatian band Thompson's June 17, 2007 performance in Zagreb's Maksimir Stadium in front of a crowd of 70,000 and more.

Song list
Uvod  (Intro)
Početak
Dolazak Hrvata
Duh ratnika
Ne varaj me
Prijatelji
Tamo gdje su moji korijeni
Moj Ivane
Stari se
Sine moj
Ratnici svjetla
Neću izdat ja
Moj dida i ja
E, moj narode
Kletva kralja Zvonimira
Reci, brate moj
Zaustavi se vjetre
Croatio, iz duše te ljubim (Tomislav Bralić and klapa Intrade)
Lijepa li si
Lipa Kaja
Iza devet sela
Bojna Čavoglave

Geni kameni
Diva Grabovčeva
Dan dolazi
Lijepa li si

Thompson (band) albums
2007 video albums